We Are All in Temporary Liberty is a 1971 Italian crime drama film written and directed by Manlio Scarpelli.

Cast 

 Riccardo Cucciolla as Mario De Rossi 
 Philippe Noiret as Judge Francesco Langellone 
 Macha Méril as  Gisella
 Bruno Cirino as  Panzacchi 
 Lionel Stander as  Lawyer Bartoli 
 Vittorio De Sica  as Giuseppe Mancini
 Marilù Tolo as  Emilia
 Ivo Garrani as   The  Chief Prosecutor 
 Claudio Gora as  The   Director 
 Francesca Romana Coluzzi as  Widow Virgizio
 Mario Pisu as  Deputy Virgizio
 Vittorio Sanipoli as  Quaestor 
 Lia Zoppelli as  The  Owner of the Atelier
 Umberto Raho as   Di Meo 
 Vinicio Sofia as  The    Neofascist
 Riccardo Garrone as The  Deputy from Lampedusa
 Jürgen Drews as   Jacques
 Renate Schmidt as   Iris  
 Andrea Bosic

References

External links

Italian crime drama films
1971 crime drama films
1971 films
1970s Italian films